Prior's Field is an independent girls' boarding and day school in Guildford, Surrey in the south-east of England. Founded in 1902 by Julia Huxley, it stands in 42 acres of parkland, 34 miles south-west of London and adjacent to the A3 road, which runs between the capital and the south coast.

Current ratings
Today, the school has 440 pupils aged 11 to 18 attend Prior's Field, with a third of UK and foreign students boarding on a full, weekly or flexible basis. The Headteacher is Mrs Tracy Kirnig, who joined in 2015 from Caterham School, Surrey and is the school's 11th head.

In its most recent report, the Independent Schools Inspectorate (ISI) awarded Prior's Field its top rating – excellent – across all categories of inspection, including quality of achievement, teaching, pastoral care, boarding and links with parents. Prior's Field pupils typically take 9 GCSEs in Year 11 and have a choice of 24 A-levels in the Sixth Form. In 2016, at A-level, 15 per cent of girls achieved A* grades, 76 per cent A-B grades and the pass rate was 100 per cent. At GCSE, 28 per cent gained A* grades, 55 per cent A*-A and 79 per cent A*–B. Students participate in over 40 termly clubs, including silversmithing, philosophy, riding, chess and debating. A supportive university application process ensures that girls move to higher education, the majority to Russell Group universities.

History
Prior's Field School opened on 23 January 1902, with only seven pupils. It was founded by Julia Huxley, the mother of Julian Huxley and Aldous Huxley, niece of the poet Matthew Arnold and granddaughter of Dr Thomas Arnold, headmaster of Rugby School, immortalised in the novel Tom Brown's Schooldays. The Huxley Family is interesting historically for achievements across the fields of science, medicine, literature and education. Julian Huxley became a biologist, the first Director of UNESCO and a founder member of the World Wildlife Fund. Aldous Huxley was the author of Brave New World (1932).  W. B. Yeats, George Bernard Shaw and Lewis Carroll were family friends. The school motto, "We live by Admiration, Hope and Love," is from The Excursion by William Wordsworth.

Starting with a five-acre (2 ha) plot and a moderately sized house designed by C.F.A. Voysey, Julia Huxley opened her school with one boarder, five day girls, a wire-haired terrier and her -year-old son, Aldous.

Julia Huxley was married to Leonard Huxley, a biographer and writer and former assistant master at Charterhouse School. She died in 1908 at the age of 46, after only six years as Headmistress, and was succeeded by Mrs Ethel Burton-Brown, who was Head from 1908 to 1927. The school magazine first appeared in June 1908, by which time there were 85 pupils and 86 Old Girls.

Both Julia Huxley and Ethel Burton-Brown are buried in Compton Cemetery, the grave of the latter being designed by Mary Watts, wife of the painter and sculptor George Frederic Watts (1817–1904).

Architecture

Prior's Field, originally called Prior's Garth, was designed by prominent English Arts and Crafts movement architect C.F.A. Voysey. The house has been Grade II listed on the National Heritage List for England since May 1985.

Many of Voysey's original features – stylised keyholes, door handles, air vents, and fireplaces – can still be seen in the school today, for instance in the Oak Hall, the Senior Common Room and the Bursary offices. The additions to the original house – formerly known as Private Side – were designed by Voysey's pupil, Thomas Müntzer.

Garden inspired by Gertrude Jekyll
The design of Prior's Field's rose garden was created by Leonard Huxley in collaboration with Gertrude Jekyll. It includes herbaceous borders, dry Bargate stone walls, a dipping pond and rock garden. In the early years, the care of the gardens was in the hands of lady gardeners trained at Swanley Horticultural College.

Prior's Field Centenary and 110th Anniversary
To mark the school's centenary in 2002, a £1.2 million sports hall was built. Designed in the style of Voysey and named the Centenary Sports Hall, it was opened by the physiologist and  biophysicist Andrew Huxley, the recipient of the 1963 Nobel Prize in Physiology or Medicine and younger son of Leonard Huxley by his second marriage to Rosalind Bruce.

The 110th anniversary of Prior's Field's foundation was marked in 2012 by a service in Guildford Cathedral, construction of an all-weather sports pitch opened by the British Olympian hockey player Crista Cullen, and the annual Huxley Lecture in memory of the school's founder, delivered by the scientist and academic Susan Greenfield in November.

In September 2013 the actress Diana Rigg opened a new three-storey teaching centre, siting the Creative Arts subjects in one area, providing six additional classrooms, a new school entrance and facilities for maths and modern languages.

In March 2017, the former Prior's Field Head Julie Roseblade opened a new Science, Technology and Music Centre, named the Arnold Building in memory of the school's founder, Julia Huxley.

Notable alumnae

Patricia Angadi (1914–2001), portrait painter and novelist
Enid Bagnold (1889–1981), playwright and author of 'The Chalk Garden, National Velvet'', etc.; great-grandmother of Samantha Cameron, wife of David Cameron
Jill Bennett (1931–1990), actress
Alex Evans (born 1989), actress
Victoria Hamilton (born 1971), actress
Heather Joan Harvey (1899–1989), English writer and Liberal Party politician
Lily James (born 1989), actress
Freda Utley (1898–1978), writer and activist
Mary Warnock, Baroness Warnock (born 1924), crossbench peer
Margaret Yorke (1924–2012), crime writer, winner of the Crime Writers' Association Cartier Diamond Dagger Award, 1999
Tessa Tennant (1959–2018), advocate of sustainable investment
Tilly Smith (born 1994), credited with saving the lives of about 100 beachgoers at Maikhao Beach in Thailand

Notable staff
Jane Lunnon, later head of Wimbledon High School and Alleyn's School

Admission
The main entry ages for Prior's Field are 11+, 13+ and 16+. Girls attend a Preview Day in November, when they undertake some informal tests and activities, and then sit an Entrance Exam the following January. At 16+, entrance is dependent on GCSE results and the outcome of an interview.

Fees, scholarships and bursaries
As at September 2017, day fees are £17,700, weekly boarding fees £27,900 and full boarding fees £29,925 per annum.

Means-tested bursaries are available at all points of entry, including Sixth Form academic bursaries for day places, and may be up to 100 per cent of fees.

Each year, a number of Prior's Field scholarships are awarded for entry at 11+, 13+ and 16+ for academic promise as well as in the areas of art, drama, music or sport.

References

External links

The Independent Schools Inspectorate's (ISI) March 2011 Report on Prior's Field

1902 establishments in England
Arts and Crafts architecture in England
Boarding schools in Surrey
Buildings by C.F.A. Voysey
Educational institutions established in 1902
Girls' schools in Surrey
Grade II listed buildings in Surrey
Grade II listed educational buildings
Houses completed in 1900
Private schools in Surrey